Ann Bowditch is a road cyclist from Guernsey. She has represented Guernsey in three Commonwealth Games - 2002, 2010, 2014.

Ann won the British National Hillclimb Championship 3 times in 2004, 2005 and 2006.

References

External links
 profile at Procyclingstats.com

Guernsey female cyclists
Living people
Place of birth missing (living people)
1989 births
Cyclists at the 2002 Commonwealth Games
Cyclists at the 2010 Commonwealth Games
Cyclists at the 2014 Commonwealth Games
Commonwealth Games competitors for Guernsey